West Liberty may refer to some places in the United States:

West Liberty, Illinois
West Liberty, Howard County, Indiana
West Liberty, Jay County, Indiana
West Liberty, Iowa
West Liberty, Kentucky
West Liberty, Missouri
West Liberty, Ohio, in Logan County
West Liberty, Crawford County, Ohio
West Liberty, Morrow County, Ohio
West Liberty, Pennsylvania
West Liberty, West Virginia
West Liberty University